føtex is a Danish chain of supermarkets. The business was established in 1960 as the first supermarket in Denmark and later gave rise to Salling Group (previously Dansk Supermarked Group).

The name "føtex" is a mix of the Danish words "Fødevarer" (daily groceries) and "Textil" (textiles).

History 

Herman Salling opened the first føtex in 1960 in the street "Guldsmedgade" in the city of Århus in Denmark.
Føtex in many ways revolutionized the way in which the Danes shopped: this was the first time the Danes saw a non-food (electronics, clothes, perfumes, books etc.) and a food department gathered under one roof.

In 1964, Herman Salling, ancestor of Ferdinand Salling, realized that to compete with other initiatives starting in those years, he needed a strong financial support. He contacted the A.P. Møller-Mærsk Group which acquired 50% of the shares and supported Sallings project financially.

As of 2006, the chain consists of 76 stores located all over Denmark.

A typical store 
Inside a typical føtex, there is a food section, a deli and a non-food section. The food section is like a full-service supermarket, with a bakery and a butcher.

The non-food section includes electronics, cosmetics and clothing among other general things.

Føtex also launched an e-commerce area with the ability to print digital photos. The online store also includes music downloads.

føtex food 
The føtex food concept was introduced in 2010, also in the original store in Guldsmedgade in Aarhus at the store's 50-year anniversary. The føtex food concept phased out the non-food departments and concentrated focus on food items instead.

See also
 Bilka
 Netto
 Tøj & Sko
 A-Z
 A.P. Møller-Mærsk
 Dansk Supermarked A/S

Sources

External links

 fotex.dk - føtex website
 dsg.dk - Dansk Supermarked Gruppen

Retail companies established in 1960
Supermarkets of Denmark
Companies based in Aarhus
Dansk Supermarked
Salling Group